H. Hasan Aroeboesman Airport , also known as Ende Airport or Isi Airport, is an airport in Ende, Flores island, East Nusa Tenggara, Indonesia. The airport serves as the point of entry to the Kelimutu National Park, which is located 60 km from the airport.

With a runway length of 1,650 meters and a width of 30 meters, the airport is capable of serving flights with a frequency of 6-12 flights per day. The airport is served by airlines such as Garuda Indonesia Explore, TransNusa Air Services and Wings Air. The airport is capable of accommodating aircraft such as the ATR-72 and Xian MA-60. The new passenger terminal building has an area of 800 square meters replacing the old terminal which only has an area of 370 square meters. The new terminal have also been equipped with six ticket counters, three room quarantine and security. The airport check-in space is able to accommodate as many as 3-6 airlines, 80 sets of new seats, air-conditioning means 15 units as well as the capacity of the reception area. The waiting room was originally only able to accommodate 40-50 people; now it can hold 180-200.

The airport is surrounded by sea and mountains, and is probably one of the most extreme airports in Indonesia. Pilots have to turn 90 degrees plane shortly after takeoff or before landing. Not without reason, because there is a mountain a few kilometers from the end of the runway. Therefore, only the most experienced pilots are allowed to pilot aircraft that is going to or from the airport.

Improvement
The current apron can accommodate three planes. When more than three need to use the apron, any additional plane(s) must wait. Wait times for the use of the apron by a fourth or fifth plane have been up to 20 minutes. In 2014, the apron was scheduled to be enlarged to the east to accommodate up to five planes.

Airlines and destinations

See also 
 Komodo Airport also in Flores island

References

External links
Ende Airport - Indonesia Airport global website
Aviation Photos: Ende - H. Hasan Aroeboesman (ENE / WATE) at Airliners.net

Airports in East Nusa Tenggara